The 2008 Formula BMW Americas season was the fifth season of Formula BMW Americas, formerly Formula BMW USA, an open wheel racing series for junior drivers, whose mission is to develop talented young drivers and introduce them to auto racing.

The championship was mainly raced in USA, the only exceptions are in June for the Canadian Grand Prix in Montreal and in November for the Brazilian Grand Prix, both as a Formula One support race. The series crowned champion Alexander Rossi.

Teams and drivers
All cars were Mygale FB02 chassis powered by BMW engines.

Races

Standings 
Points were awarded as follows:

Drivers' Championship

References

External links 
 Official Website
 BMW-Motorsport.com

Formula BMW seasons
Formula BMW
BMW Americas